All in My Head may refer to:

 "All in My Head" (Good Shoes song)
 "All in My Head" (Kosheen song), 2003
 All in My Head, an EP by Seaway
 "All in My Head", a song by the Backstreet Boys from NKOTBSB
 "All in My Head", a song by Nadia Ali
 "All In My Head", a song by Smile Empty Soul from the 2016 EP Shapeshifter
 "All in My Head", a song by Shawn Mullins from the 2008 album Honeydew
 "All in My Head" (Tori Kelly song), on the 2012 EP Handmade Songs
 All in My Head (Flex), a 2016 song by Fifth Harmony